Pico da Esperança is the highest mountain of São Jorge Island, Azores. Its elevation is 1,053 m. It is situated in the Norte Grande parish, Velas municipality.

References

Mountains of Portugal
São Jorge Island
Esperanca